Saint Ephraim II of Pereyaslav, also Saint Ephraim of the Caves or Saint Ephraim, Bishop of Pereslav - Eastern Orthodox saint, bishop of Pereiaslav, Ukraine).

Before his tonsure into monasticism, was treasurer and steward of household affairs (1054–1068) at the court of the Iziaslav Yaroslavich  the Grand Prince of Kiev. Weighed down by this noisy and bustling life and wishing to become a monk, he was accepted by Saint Anthony of Kiev and was tonsured (23 March) by Saint Nikon the Chronicler, then the Hegumen of the Kyiv Monastery of the Caves.

The enraged Iziaslav demanded that Ephraim return, threatening to lock him up in prison and to destroy the Kyiv Monastery of the Caves (the Pechersk Lavra). St Anthony and the brethren left the monastery and decided to go to another place. Iziaslav, however, feared the wrath of God. He took his wife's advice and withdrew his forces from the monastery in disgrace.

Ephraim wished to go on pilgrimage to the holy places abroad. With the blessing of St Anthony, he journeyed to Constantinople and settled there in one of the monasteries. While in Constantinople, Ephraim made a copy of the Studite monastic rule, and took it to Kyiv at the request of Theodosius of Kiev. As soon as he received the Rule, Theodosius implemented it in his monastery (the Pechersk Lavra).

After the year 1072 Ephraim was made bishop in Pereslav, with the title of Metropolitan. He adorned Pereslav with many beautiful churches and public buildings, and he built stone walls around the city in the Greek manner. He built free hospices for the poor and travelers, and constructed several public bath-houses.

In the year 1091, Ephraim participated in the opening and solemn transfer of the relics of St Theodosius. A Life of St Ephraim existed in former times, but it has not survived. We find an account of him both in the Life of St Theodosius, and in the Russian Chronicles. A tale and encomium for St Nicholas the Wonderworker is ascribed to Ephraim.

Ephraim died in the year 1098. He was buried in the Church of the Presentation in the Near Caves of the Kyiv Monastery of the Caves.

His memory is also celebrated on 28 January, 28 September, and on the second Sunday of Great Lent.

External links
 Lives of All Saints

1098 deaths
11th-century Eastern Orthodox bishops
Monks of Kyiv Pechersk Lavra
Eastern Orthodox saints from Ukraine
Russian saints
11th-century Christian saints
Burials at the Near Caves, Kyiv Pechersk Lavra
Year of birth unknown
11th-century Rus' people